João Batista is Portuguese for John the Baptist. It may refer to:

 João Batista de Andrade (born 1939), Brazilian film director and screenwriter
 João Batista Queiroz ( 1950–1980s), Brazilian comics artist and illustrator
 João Batista da Silva (athlete) (born 1963), Brazilian sprinter
 João Batista (footballer, born 1961), Brazilian football defender
 João Batista (footballer, born 1966), Brazilian football midfielder
 João Batista (footballer, born 1975), Turkish-Brazilian football midfielder

See also
 São João Batista (disambiguation)
 Juan Bautista (disambiguation)
 Jean-Baptiste